William Bullock ( – 7 March 1849) was an English traveller, naturalist and antiquarian.

Life
Bullock began as a goldsmith and jeweller in Birmingham.
By 1795 Bullock was in Liverpool, where he founded a Museum of Natural Curiosities at 24 Lord Street.  
While still trading as a jeweller and goldsmith, in 1801 he published a descriptive catalogue of the works of art, armoury, objects of natural history, and other curiosities in the collection, some of which had been brought back by members of James Cook's expeditions.
In 1809, Bullock moved to London and the collection, housed first at 22 Piccadilly and in 1812 in the newly built Piccadilly Egyptian Hall, proved extremely popular. 
The collection, which included over 32,000 items, was disposed of by auction in 1819.

In 1810, Bullock figured briefly in a law case concerning Sarah Baartman, a Khoikhoi woman brought to England for purposes of exhibition as the "Hottentot Venus".  
Bullock had been approached by Alexander Dunlop, the army surgeon responsible for Baartman's arrival in England, but had declined to be involved in the proposed show.

In 1822 Bullock went to Mexico where he became involved in silver mine speculation. He brought back many artefacts and specimens which formed a new exhibition in the Egyptian Hall. A second visit to Mexico, and to the United States, took place in 1827. 
Bullock bought land on the bank of the Ohio River from Thomas D. Carneal where he proposed to build a utopian community named Hygeia (a Greek word meaning health) laid out by John Buonarotti Papworth.  
The speculation was not a success, although some people, including Frances Trollope, took part; Bullock sold the land to Israel Ludlow, Jr. in 1846. 

Bullock was back in London by 1843 and died there at 14 Harley Terrace, Chelsea. He was buried at St Mary's Church, Chelsea, on 16 March 1849.

Bullock was a fellow of the Linnean, Horticultural, Geological, Wernerian, and other learned societies, and published several pamphlets on natural history.

Works
 A Companion to the Liverpool Museum, containing a brief description of ... natural & foreign curiosities, antiquities & productions of the fine arts, open for public inspection ... at the house of William Bullock, Church Street. Liverpool: T. Schofield, printer, ca. 1801., numerous editions.
 A concise and easy method of preserving objects of natural history: intended for the use of sportsmen, travellers, and others; to enable them to prepare and preserve such curious and rare articles. London: printed for the proprietor, 1818. 2. Ed.
 Six months' residence and travels in Mexico; containing remarks on the present state of New Spain, its natural productions, state of society, manufactures, trade, agriculture, and antiquities, &c.. London: John Murray, 1824.
 Sechs Monate in Mexiko oder Bemerkungen über den gegenwärtigen Zustand Neu-Spaniens von W. Bullock. Aus dem Engl. übers. von Friedrich Schott. Dresden: Hilscher, 1825.
 Le Mexique en 1823, ou Relation d'un voyage dans la Nouvelle-Espagne, contenant des notions exactes et peu connues sur la situation physique, morale et politique de ce pays. Paris: Alexis-Eymery, 1824.
 A description of the unique exhibition, called Ancient Mexico: collected on the spot in 1823 ... for public inspection at the Egyptian Hall, Piccadilly. London: Printed for the proprietors, 1824.
 Catalogue of the exhibition, called Modern Mexico: containing a panoramic view of the city, with specimens of the natural history of New Spain ... at the Egyptian Hall, Piccadilly. London: Printed for the proprietor, 1824
 A descriptive catalogue of the exhibition, entitled Ancient and Modern Mexico: containing a panoramic view of the present city, specimens of the natural history of New Spain ... at the Egyptian Hall, Piccadilly. London: Printed for the proprietors, 1825.
 Sketch of a journey through the Western States of North America: from New Orleans, by the Mississippi, Ohio, city of Cincinnati and falls of Niagara, to New York, in 1827. London: Miller, 1827

References

Further reading

 
 Robert D. Aguirre: Informal Empire: Mexico and Central America in Victorian Culture. Minneapolis and London: University of Minnesota Press, 2005.
 William Bullock: Sketch of a Journey through the Western States of North America, 1827.
 Michael P. Costeloe: William Bullock and the Mexican Connection. In: Mexican Studies/Estudios Mexicanos, Summer 2006, Vol. 22, No. 2, Pages 275–309. Online-Version
Papavero, N. & Ibanez-Bernal, S., 2001 Contributions to a history of Mexican Dipterology. Part I. Entomologists and their works before the Biologia Centrali-Americana.  Acta Zoologica Mexicana Nueva Serie 84: 65–173.
Pearce, S. M. (2008) ‘William Bullock: Collections and Exhibitions at the Egyptian Hall, London: 1816–25’, Journal of the History of Collections, 20, 17–35
F.D. Steinheimer The whereabouts of pre-nineteenth century bird specimens Zool. Med. Leiden 79-3 (5), 30-ix-2005, 45–67.— ISSN 0024-0672.pdf

External links
BHL A companion to Mr. Bullock's London Museum and Pantherion : containing a brief description of upwards of fifteen thousand natural and foreign curiosities, antiquities, and productions of the fine arts, collected during seventeen years of arduous research.....(Bullock, William, Howitt, Samuel and Wells, John West [London] First Printed for the proprietor,1812. 12th Edition
pdf BHL Catalogue of the exhibition, called modern Mexico : containing a panoramic view of the city, with specimens of the natural history of New Spain, and models of the vegetable produce, costume, &c. &c. : now open for public inspection at the Egyptian Hall, Piccadilly London :Printed for the proprietor,1824

1770s births
1849 deaths
English art collectors
English antiquarians
English naturalists
English entomologists
English goldsmiths
People from Sheffield
English Mesoamericanists
Mesoamerican art collectors
Fellows of the Linnean Society of London
19th-century Mesoamericanists